Joseph James Pavelski (born July 11, 1984) is an American professional ice hockey player and alternate captain for the Dallas Stars of the National Hockey League (NHL). He previously played for the San Jose Sharks for the first thirteen years of his NHL career and served as captain during his final four years with the team. He attended University of Wisconsin and played for the Wisconsin Badgers men's ice hockey team.

Nicknamed "Little Joe" and "Captain America", Pavelski scored a goal in his first NHL game, making him the 11th Sharks player in the history of the team to do so. He holds the record for most playoff goals by an American-born player, with 64.

Internationally, Pavelski won a silver medal as a member of the United States men's national ice hockey team at the 2010 Winter Olympics in Vancouver. He also served as captain of Team USA at the 2016 World Cup of Hockey in Toronto.

Personal life
Pavelski was born in Plover, Wisconsin to Sandy and Mike Pavelski. He has three siblings – Jerry, Sheri, and Scott. His family is Polish origin and their surname was originally spelled Pawelski. His mother said: "He loved anything athletic, and hockey was just a good fit for the winter. You didn't realize that your son was that good." Pavelski is co-owner of the Janesville Jets NAHL team. His younger brother, Scott, was a student-athlete for four years with the University of New Hampshire men's ice hockey team, but did not play professionally.

Playing career

Amateur
Pavelski won a Wisconsin State Hockey Championship with SPASH (Stevens Point Area Senior High) Panthers in 2002. He was a member of the 2004 Clark Cup champion Waterloo Black Hawks of the USHL. He won the 2004 USHL Dave Tyler Junior Player of the Year Award.

Pavelski played in 84 games over two seasons (2004–06) at the University of Wisconsin of the Western Collegiate Hockey Association He recorded 101 points (39–62). Pavelski was named to the All-WCHA Rookie Team in 2005, was selected to the All-WCHA Second Team, and the Men's RBK Division I West All-America Second Team. He helped Wisconsin win the 2006 NCAA Division I Men's Ice Hockey Championship, while leading the team in overall points.

Professional

San Jose Sharks (2006–2019)
Pavelski began his NHL career in the 2006–07 season. He began on a hot streak, scoring a goal in his first game, and scoring 7 goals and 10 points in his first 12 games. Pavelski earned the nickname  "Little Joe" from Sharks announcer Randy Hahn, a reference to Pavelski's teammate and San Jose superstar "Jumbo Joe", Joe Thornton.

During the 2007–08 season, Pavelski became a regular player on the Sharks roster and one of the best and most consistent young players on the squad, playing in all 82 regular season games and in all 13 2008 Stanley Cup playoff games. He also became one of the most effective players in the NHL during shootouts, scoring 7 times on 11 opportunities that season. During the 2008 playoffs, he was tied with Ryane Clowe for the team lead in goals (five) and tied for second with Clowe in points (nine). Pavelski also led San Jose with three game-winning goals during the playoffs, which tied for third most in the playoffs overall. In addition to his offensive numbers, he finished tied 12th among NHL forwards in blocked shots (59) during the regular season.

Pavelski had another solid season in 2008–09, playing in 80 games and recording 25 goals and 34 assists for 59 points, career-highs for all three statistics at the time.

During the 2010 playoffs, Pavelski had three-straight multi-goal games (Game 6 against the Colorado Avalanche and Games 1 and 2 against the Detroit Red Wings), not only helping the Sharks win all three games, but also becoming the first player to do so since Mario Lemieux in 1992. It was after this streak that he also picked up the nickname "The Big Pavelski" to accompany his nickname of "Little Joe".

Pavelski came close to scoring his first NHL hat-trick on March 19, 2011, against the St. Louis Blues. After the game, however, one of the goals was awarded to Patrick Marleau, when it had been originally attributed to Pavelski.

During the 2012–13 NHL lockout, Pavelski signed with Belarusian team Dinamo Minsk of the Kontinental Hockey League (KHL).

On July 30, 2013, the Sharks announced that Pavelski had signed a new five-year contract with the team effective from the 2014–15 season through to the 2018–19 season.

On March 11, 2014, against the Toronto Maple Leafs, Pavelski scored his 400th career NHL point. During the season, Pavelski recorded a career-high 41 goals and 79 points.

During the 2014–15 season, Pavelski had another strong offensive season, scoring 70 points (37 goals and 33 assists) and was named one of the Sharks' four alternate captains.

On October 5, 2015, Pavelski was named the Sharks' ninth captain in history, over teammates (and former Sharks' captains) Joe Thornton and Patrick Marleau.

During the 2015–16 regular season, Pavelski tallied 78 points (38 goals and 40 assists) and he earned a spot in the 2016 NHL All-Star Game. He finished fifth in the NHL in goals with 38, sixth in points and first in game-winning goals with 11. Pavelski's success continued into the 2016 playoffs, as he led the Sharks into their first ever Stanley Cup Finals. Pavelski only scored one goal in the Finals, though he still finished as the playoff leader in goals (14) and finished third in points (23).

From 2013 to 2016, Pavelski scored the second-most goals in the NHL with 116 and second-most power play goals with 47, behind only Alexander Ovechkin in both categories.

On December 1, 2017, Pavelski scored his 300th NHL goal on a pass from Joe Thornton against the Florida Panthers. He became only the second Sharks player to score 300 goals with the team, Patrick Marleau.

On April 23, 2019, during the 2019 playoffs, Pavelski suffered a major head injury after a cross check from Vegas Golden Knights center Cody Eakin, followed immediately by an incidental collision with Vegas' Paul Stastny which knocked Pavelski awkwardly to the ice. Pavelski was helped off of the ice and did not return to the game. Eakin was charged with a five-minute major penalty and a ten-minute game misconduct, which enabled the Sharks to score four goals in five minutes and send the game to overtime. The Sharks later won the game 5–4 in overtime and advanced to the second round of the playoffs.

Dallas Stars (2019–present)
On July 1, 2019, as an unrestricted free agent, Pavelski signed a three-year, $21 million contract with the Dallas Stars. On August 16, 2020, during the Stanley Cup playoffs, Pavelski scored the first postseason hat-trick in Stars history since their relocation from Minnesota; Dino Ciccarelli (twice), Steve Payne and Bob Brooke had previously scored playoff hat-tricks for the North Stars.

On September 26, 2020, Pavelski scored his 61st playoff goal, surpassing Joe Mullen (who has 60 playoff goals) as the all-time playoff goal scorer by a United States-born player.

Pavelski was named an alternate captain for the 2021–22 season and has played on the Stars' top-line, alongside Roope Hintz and Jason Robertson. That top-line has contributed heavily to the goal-scoring of the Stars for the season, with the line combining for almost 44% of the Stars’ goals. Given the age difference between Pavelski and his linemates (12 and 15 years), the line became known as the “Pavelski and Sons” line in the Dallas sports media. On November 26, he scored his 400th NHL goal, making him the tenth American-born player to do so. He would go on to enjoy a highly productive output during the 2021–22 season, scoring 27 goals with 54 assists for a career-best 81 points in the season.

On March 11, 2022 the Stars signed Pavelski to a one-year, $5.5 million contract.

International play

On January 1, 2010, Pavelski was selected to the 2010 USA Olympic team, the only USA player from the San Jose Sharks. He had three assists in the team's silver medal effort and was second in faceoff percentage amongst all players in the tournament. In the waning seconds of regulation time in the gold medal game, Pavelski won a faceoff, swatted a clearing attempt out of the air, and made a pass that set up the play that resulted in the Americans tying the game with 24 seconds left. He was nicknamed "Swiss Army Knife" by USA general manager Brian Burke. On January 1, 2014, Pavelski was selected to the 2014 USA Olympic team, his second appearance. After being named captain of Team USA for the 2016 World Cup of Hockey, he also earned the nickname "Captain America".

Career statistics

Regular season and playoffs
Bold indicates led league

International

Awards and honors

Records
Most playoff goals by an American-born player - 64

Transactions
 June 22, 2003 – Drafted by the San Jose Sharks in the seventh round, 205th overall.
 In 2006, Pavelski signed a two-year entry level contract with an annual average value of $850,000.
 On June 25, 2008, Pavelski signed a contract extension paying him $3.3 million over the next two years.
 On June 24, 2010, Pavelski signed a four-year, $16 million contract to stay with the Sharks.
 On July 30, 2013, Pavelski signed a five-year, $30 million contract extension with the Sharks.
 On July 1, 2019, Pavelski signed a three-year, $21 million contract with the Dallas Stars.
 On March 11, 2022, Pavelski signed a one-year, $5.5 million contract extension with the Dallas Stars.

References

External links

1984 births
American expatriate ice hockey players in Belarus
American men's ice hockey centers
American men's ice hockey right wingers
American people of Polish descent
Dallas Stars players
HC Dinamo Minsk players
Ice hockey players from Wisconsin
Ice hockey players at the 2014 Winter Olympics
Ice hockey players at the 2010 Winter Olympics
Living people
Medalists at the 2010 Winter Olympics
National Hockey League All-Stars
Olympic silver medalists for the United States in ice hockey
People from Plover, Wisconsin
San Jose Sharks draft picks
San Jose Sharks players
Sportspeople from San Jose, California
Waterloo Black Hawks players
Wisconsin Badgers men's ice hockey players
Worcester Sharks players
AHCA Division I men's ice hockey All-Americans